Vingunguti is an administrative ward in the Ilala District of the Dar es Salaam Region of Tanzania. The ward lies south west of the Dar es Salaam central business district. According to the 2012 census, the ward has a total population of 106,946.

The total number of residents at Vingunguti ward is 106,946 and 21868 households. It comprises six Mitaa, namely Mtambani, Mtakuja, Miembeni, Kombo, Butiama and Majengo.

The name Vingunguti is originated from the presence of long trees, so called Minguti in 1970 and that time there were two streets Wapendanao (Kombo) and Mtambani, the first school was known as TAPA which has provided pre-primary school and primary school from standard 1 to 4 level. In 1980 the streets was increased from two streets up to four streets as Mtakuja and Miembeni come up to the list. In 1990's Mlawa Dispensary was established near Miembeni area and goes to be the very first Health center in the area. The name comes from the Dr.Mlawa who was the doctor at Muhimbili Referral Hospital (Muhimbili National Hospital) who was living in Vingunguti.

The first primary schools in Vingunguti are Kombo and Vingunguti 'A' were established in early in 1980s then Mtakuja and Miembeni were come to the list in 2000. The only Secondary School to admit ordinary level students in the ward was Vingunguti Secondary School near Miembeni area in 2010.

Vingunguti Ward has a total of 4 dispensaries operating in the area namely Vingunguti (Mlawa), Emara, Tayma and Afya Bora. Sources of water are long and short (depth) wells, tap water and river water from  Msimbazi River Valley. Source of income are entrepreneurship, business activities, trading activities, salary, salary from casual labor, house renting, local transportation services (bodaboda, bajaj and Taxi) along with whole sale and retail shops.

There are railways and all seasonal roads in the area used as the main means of the transportation. The common likely used food in Vingunguti is Cassava, beans, rice, maize flour (sembe), wheat flour, meat, potatoes and banana.

Vingunguti also hosts the following;
Chai Bora  a famous tea manufacturer based in Vingunguti.

References

Ilala District
Wards of Dar es Salaam Region